José Jaime Parada Hoyl (born November 2, 1977 in Santiago, Chile) is a Chilean gay rights activist and politician who became the first openly gay person elected to public office in Chile. He serves as the spokesperson for Movimiento de Integración y Liberación Homosexual, the leading Chilean gay rights organization. He was elected councilman for his home commune of Providencia for the 2012–2016 term.

Biography 
Parada was born in the commune of Las Condes. His father is a Panamanian-Chilean veterinarian and his mother is a homemaker. He completed his secondary schooling at the Instituto Presidente Errázuriz, a state-subsidized Catholic boys school. He studied history at Finis Terrae University, graduating first in his class. He is currently a doctoral candidate of history at the Pontifical Catholic University of Chile in the area of the social history of science. At Finis Terrae, Parada served as the director of the School of History and the research and archives coordinator of the Centro de Investigación y Documentación en Historia de Chile Contemporáneo ("Center for Research and Documentation of Contemporary Chilean History") from 2010–2011.

In June 2010, Parada came to prominence after his article "El matrimonio gay en cartas" ("Gay marriage in letters") was published in the newspaper The Clinic. It consisted of a series of e-mails exchanged Parada and a family member on in support of gay marriage, which is not currently recognized by the state. In 2011, Parada began his career as a political activist, joining MOVILH and becoming its spokesperson. In March 2012, after the brutal beating of Daniel Zamudio by neo-Nazis because of his sexual orientation, Parada and MOVILH played an important role in securing legislation introducing severe penalties for hate crimes on the basis of sexual orientation. That year, with the support of Marco Enríquez-Ominami's Progressive Party, Parada launched his candidacy for municipal councilman for the commune of Providencia, winning a four-year term to last until 2016. Parada was backed by Josefa Errázuriz, who successfully ran for mayor of Providencia, against the conservative incumbent, Cristián Labbé, whom Parada has referred to as a “recalcitrant fascist” for his support of the Pinochet regime. His victory makes him the first openly gay politician elected in Chilean history.

Electoral history

2012 municipal election 

 2012 municipal election, for the municipal council of Providencia

(Candidates with more than 2% of the votes are listed.)

References

External links 

1977 births
Living people
Chilean LGBT politicians
Chilean gay men
Chilean LGBT rights activists
Politicians from Santiago
Gay politicians
Chilean historians
Chilean people of Panamanian descent
21st-century Chilean politicians
Progressive Party (Chile) politicians